{{Infobox mineral
| name        = Uytenbogaardtite
| category    = Sulfide mineral
| boxwidth    = 
| boxbgcolor  = 
| image       = Uytenbogaardtite.jpg
| imagesize   = 260px
| caption     = Uytenbogaardtite, from New Bullfrog Mine, Nye County, Nevada, United States of America
| formula     = Ag3AuS2
| IMAsymbol   = Uyt
| molweight   = 584.70 g/mol
| strunz      = 2.BA.40b
| color       = Greyish white 
| habit       = Microscopic crystals 
| system      = Trigonal
| class       = Ditrigonal pyramidal (3m) H-M symbol: (3m)
| symmetry    = R3c
| twinning    = 
| cleavage    = 
| fracture    = Irregular
| tenacity    = Malleable
| mohs        = 2 
| luster      = Metallic
| streak      = 
| diaphaneity = Opaque
| gravity     = 8.405
| density     = 
| polish      = 
| opticalprop = 
| refractive  = 
| birefringence = 
| pleochroism = Weak
| 2V          = 
| dispersion  = 
| extinction  = 
| length fast/slow =
| fluorescence= 
| absorption  =
| melt        = 
| fusibility  = 
| diagnostic  = 
| solubility  = 
| other       = 
| alteration  = 
| references  = <ref>[http://www.geo.arizona.edu/~mdbarton/MDB_papers_pdf/Barton78_Ag3AuS2_CM.pdf Barton, M. D., et al., Uytenbogaardtite a New Silver Gold Sulfide, Canadian Mineralogist, Vol. 16, pp. 651-657 (1978)]</ref>}}

The mineral uytenbogaardtite, Ag3AuS2, is a soft, greyish white sulfide mineral, occurring in hydrothermal Au-Ag-quartz veins. It occurs as tiny crystals, visible only with a microscope.  It has a metallic luster and a hardness on the Mohs scale of  2 (gypsum).

It forms, together with petzite (Ag3AuTe2) and fischesserite (Ag3AuSe2) the uytenbogaardtite group''. The type locality is Tambang Sawah, Bengkulu district, Sumatra island, Indonesia.

Common impurities in the uytenbogaardtite are copper, selenium, and tellurium.

It is named after the Dutch mineralogist Willem Uytenbogaardt (1918–2012), Professor of Geology, Technical University, Delft, The Netherlands, prominent ore microscopist.

See also

List of minerals
List of minerals named after people

References

Silver minerals
Gold minerals
Gold(I) compounds
Sulfide minerals
Trigonal minerals
Minerals in space group 161
Minerals described in 1978